Gretchen Hehenberger (10 February 1918 – 11 March 2012) was an Austrian gymnast who competed in the 1948 Summer Olympics.
Before moving to Austria after her marriage to Ernst Hehenberger (1917-2007) in 1943, Gretchen Sievers twice won the German championships in a combined Gymnastics and Track & Field competition including 10 different disciplines. She barely missed the 1936 Olympics due to a broken leg. In 1948, she already was the mother of two boys, Rainer (born 1944) and Michael (born 1945), respectively.

References

1918 births
2012 deaths
Austrian female artistic gymnasts
Gymnasts at the 1948 Summer Olympics
Olympic gymnasts of Austria